Wayne Larkins (born 22 November 1953) is an English former cricketer, who represented Northamptonshire, Durham and Bedfordshire as an opening batsman throughout his career. He was selected to play for England as Graham Gooch's opening partner on tours of Australia and the West Indies. He was also a semi-professional footballer.

Cricket

County career
Born in Roxton, Bedfordshire, Larkins played cricket for Northamptonshire from 1972 until 1991. He moved to first-class newcomers Durham in 1992, retiring from the first-class game in 1995. He scored 27,142 first-class runs in 482 matches, with 59 centuries and a highest score of 252. He also snared 42 wickets with his medium pace.  He was a strong force in domestic one-day cricket, playing 485 matches and scoring 13,594 runs with 26 hundreds.

He was part of the unlucky Northamptonshire side narrowly defeated in the final of both major domestic knock-out tournaments in 1987, the Benson & Hedges Cup and the NatWest Trophy. In the latter, Larkins top-scored but still finished on the losing side as Richard Hadlee engineered an unlikely successful run chase for Nottinghamshire. He did however finish on the winning side in the Benson & Hedges Cup final of 1980.

International career
Larkins first achieved England recognition during the 1979 Cricket World Cup. As England progressed through the tournament they decided to gamble on lengthening their batting line up by bringing in Larkins instead of a specialist bowler or allrounder such as Geoff Miller or Phil Edmonds, meaning that according to competition rules, Larkins, Graham Gooch and Geoff Boycott, all part-time bowlers, would probably have to bowl 12 overs between them a match. This gamble paid off in the semi-final where England beat New Zealand narrowly, but failed in the final, where England lost to the West Indies and Larkins had a miserable match.

He made his test debut in Australia the following winter. By the end of 1981 he had played six Tests but not been given an extended run in the side and had had limited success. He decided the following winter to join the first rebel tour of South Africa alongside Gooch and Boycott. This meant that he was banned from international cricket for three years. The ban having been served, he was recalled into the England squad for the third Test against India in 1986, but had to pull out through injury, and was replaced by Mark Benson.

In fact he did not get another chance until 1989-90, ten years after his international debut. Ironically this opportunity was created by rival batters being suspended due to a further rebel tour. Initially he was recalled for the Nehru Cup of 1989-90. In his second game back he played his best international innings and only international century, in a one day international victory over Allan Border's Australia, in the process winning the man of the match award. Wisden observed that Larkins' "strokeplay" on this occasion was "both powerful and subtle. His previous highest in a one-day international was 34 in 1979-80: now he dominated an opening stand of 185 with Gooch, hit two sixes and nineteen fours in his 124, and justified his recall to the England team after an absence of eight years". In his first Test match back, eight and a half years since his last Test, against the West Indies he opened alongside Gooch and to Larkins fell the honour of scoring the winning run as England beat the West Indies in a Test match for the first time in sixteen years.

Larkins also toured Australia and New Zealand the following winter again under Gooch's captaincy, but enjoyed limited success and never again finished on the winning side in a Test match.  In all Larkins appeared in thirteen Test matches for England, scoring three fifties, and in twenty five ODIs, where he made one century.

Legacy
Although a talented player, Larkins is considered as something of an underachiever at the top level. County bowlers such as Jonathan Agnew spoke of being "Nedded" when he performed well against them. The cricket correspondent, Colin Bateman, opined, "Larkins was usually ignored when he should have been selected and selected when he should have been ignored in a career of unfulfilled potential. A destructive opening bat who could demolish any attack if he got going, 'Ned' tired of waiting for England and joined the 1982 rebel tour to South Africa".

Football
Outside cricket, he was a keen footballer. In his youth, he had been on the books of Notts County. He also played non-league football for Wolverton Town, Wellingborough Town and Buckingham Town, although he missed part of the 1985 season after gashing his leg during a match.

Mortgage controversy
In October 2006, Larkins pleaded guilty to attempting to illegally obtain a mortgage secured against the house of his girlfriend's sick father. With his girlfriend Deborah Lines, he bought a home in France. On 20 April 2007, he was given a 12-month suspended sentence, and was ordered to repay money from the sale of the property.

References

1953 births
Living people
People from the Borough of Bedford
England Test cricketers
England One Day International cricketers
English cricketers
Northamptonshire cricketers
Marylebone Cricket Club cricketers
Eastern Province cricketers
Durham cricketers
Bedfordshire cricketers
Minor Counties cricketers
Huntingdonshire cricketers
English footballers
Buckingham Town F.C. players
English fraudsters
Association footballers not categorized by position
Scarborough Festival President's XI cricketers
Test and County Cricket Board XI cricketers
D. B. Close's XI cricketers
D. H. Robins' XI cricketers
T. N. Pearce's XI cricketers
Young England cricketers
Cricketers from Bedfordshire
Footballers from Bedfordshire